Gastón Hernán Olveira Echeverría (born 21 April 1993) is a Uruguayan professional footballer who plays as a goalkeeper for Paraguayan Primera División club Club Olimpia.

Club career
Olveira began his career in 2013 with River Plate Montevideo. He made his league debut for the club on 19 April 2014 in a 2–1 away defeat to Sud América.

On 17 January 2021, Club Olimpia announced the signing of Olveira on a season long loan deal. At the end of the year, River Plate bought Olveira fra from River Plate and signed him on a permanently 4-year deal.

International career
Olveira was part of Uruguay squad which won gold medal at the 2015 Pan American Games. On 11 October 2019, he received his first call-up to the Uruguay national team as a replacement for Fernando Muslera. On 21 October 2022, he was named in Uruguay's 55-man preliminary squad for the 2022 FIFA World Cup.

Career statistics

Club

Honours
Uruguay U22
 Pan American Games: 2015

Individual
 Uruguayan Primera División Team of the Year: 2019

References

External links
 

1993 births
Living people
Footballers from Montevideo
Uruguayan footballers
Uruguayan expatriate footballers
Association football goalkeepers
Pan American Games gold medalists for Uruguay
Footballers at the 2015 Pan American Games
Pan American Games medalists in football
Medalists at the 2015 Pan American Games
Club Atlético River Plate (Montevideo) players
Club Olimpia footballers
Uruguayan Primera División players
Paraguayan Primera División players
Uruguayan expatriate sportspeople in Paraguay
Expatriate footballers in Paraguay